Barbaros Akkaş (born November 26, 1976, in İstanbul) is the Turkish Basketball Federation National Teams Director of Sport. Barbaros Akkaş, who is married to Dilara Akkaş, has been managing Turkish National Basketball Teams since 1997.

Career

National Teams Career 
1997 - 1999	U16 Men Team
2001 - 2014	Senior Men Team
2000 - 2014	Youth Teams
2014 - Now  All Women's/Men's National Teams as Director of Sport

TBL Clubs Career 
1994 - 1997	Ülkerspor Youth Men Teams
1999 - 2000	Galatasaray Senior Men Team

Professional Playing Career 
1993 - 1994 Ülkerspor U18 Team

Career Notes 

Senior Men Team: 
EuroBasket 2001 – 2nd place (2001), 
World Championship - 9th place (2002), 
EuroBasket 2003 – 12th place (2003), 
EuroBasket 2005 Elimination Group 1st place (2005), 
15th Mediterranean Games - 4th place
World Championship Men - 6th place (2006), 
EuroBasket 2007 – 11th place (2007), 
EuroBasket 2009 Elimination Group 1st place (2008), 
EuroBasket 2009 - 8th place (2009), 
2010 FIBA World Championship Men – 2nd place (2010)

Youth Teams: 
U16 EC - 2nd place (2003), U16 EC - 3rd place & U18 EC - 2nd place & U18 Albert Schweitzer Tournament 1st place (2004), U16 EC - 1st place & U18 EC - 2nd place (2005), U18 Albert Schweitzer Tournament - 2nd place & U20 EC - 2nd place & U18 EC - 4th place (2006), U16 EC - 4th place & U18 EC - 8th place & U19 WC - 7th place & U20 EC - 7th place (2007), U16 EC - 3rd place & U18 Albert Schweitzer Tournament - 2nd place & 13th Turgut Atakol Tournament - 1st place & U20 EC - 4th place (2008), T.Telekom U16 Basketball Tournament - 1st  place & European Olympic Youth Summer Festival – 3rd place & U16 EC - 8th place & U18 EC – 3rd place & U20 EC - 6th place & 16th Mediterranean Games – 3rd place (2009), U16 EC - 3rd place & U18 EC – 9th place & U20 EC – 13th place (2010), U15 EYOF – 3rd place & U16 EC – 7th place &  U18 EC – 3rd place & U20 EC – 6th place (2011).

References

1976 births
Living people
Basketball players from Istanbul
Turkish basketball coaches
Mediterranean Games bronze medalists for Turkey
Competitors at the 2009 Mediterranean Games
Mediterranean Games medalists in basketball